Archibald Bishop (September 6, 1829 – April 1901) was an Ontario political figure. He represented Huron South in the Legislative Assembly of Ontario as a Liberal member from 1873 to 1894.

He was born in Edinburgh, Scotland, was educated in Lanarkshire and came to Canada in 1849. He served on the council for Usborne Township and was warden for Huron County from 1873 to 1874. He was elected in an 1873 by-election when the sitting member resigned to accept a post as sheriff for the county.

External links 
Member's parliamentary history for the Legislative Assembly of Ontario
The Canadian parliamentary companion and annual register, 1891. J Durie
Exeter, Situate on the London & Goderich Road in the township of Stephen and Usborne..., JL Wooden (1973)

1829 births
1901 deaths
Ontario Liberal Party MPPs